"Children of the Sun" is a song by English rapper Tinie Tempah, featuring additional vocals from Swedish singer John Martin. It was released on 25 October 2013 as the second single from Tempah's second studio album Demonstration (2013). The track was produced by Eshraque "iSHi" Mughal, who also wrote Tinie's hits "Written in the Stars", "Invincible", "Game Over" and "Angels & Stars". The song reached number six in the UK Singles Chart. The song contains two references to Michael Jackson, which included the moonwalk and the song "Black or White".

Music video
The lyrics video for "Children of the Sun" premiered on Tinie Tempah's YouTube channel on 18 September 2013. The official video, directed by Jon Jon Augustavo premiered on 22 September 2013 with John Martin in the video, at a total length of five minutes and twenty seconds.

Track listing

Personnel
 Patrick "Tinie Tempah" Okogwu – vocals
 John Martin – vocals
Charlie Bernado – writer
Michel Zitron – writer
Måns Wredenberg – writer

Production
 Eshraque "iSHi" Mughal – production

Charts

Certifications

Release history

References

2013 singles
Tinie Tempah songs
John Martin (singer) songs
Parlophone singles
2013 songs
Songs written by Eshraque "iSHi" Mughal
Songs written by John Martin (singer)
Songs written by Tinie Tempah
Songs written by Michel Zitron